VIPIR may refer to :
 Volumetric Imaging and Processing of Integrated Radar, a software product for weather forecasting
 Visual Inspection Poseable Invertebrate Robot, a borescope camera for the International Space Station